The Williams–Linscott House was a historic First Period house at 357 William Street in Stoneham, Massachusetts.  The oldest part of the house was said to date to c. 1712, but it is unclear to which part of the house this referred, on account of major alterations the house in the 18th and 19th centuries.  It is believed to have begun as a four-room two-story structure built around a central chimney.  This underwent significant alteration during the Federal period, including replacing the center chimney with smaller side chimneys, and the construction of four more rooms in front of the original four.  Sometime around 1850 Micah Williams, a prosperous farmer, again refashioned the house in the then-popular Italianate style.

The house was listed on the National Register of Historic Places in 1984.  It was demolished in 2004, although architectural elements of the house were salvaged and reused elsewhere.

See also
National Register of Historic Places listings in Stoneham, Massachusetts
National Register of Historic Places listings in Middlesex County, Massachusetts

References

Houses on the National Register of Historic Places in Stoneham, Massachusetts
Georgian architecture in Massachusetts
Italianate architecture in Massachusetts
Houses completed in 1712
Houses in Stoneham, Massachusetts
Demolished buildings and structures in Massachusetts
Buildings and structures demolished in 2004